Cheryl L. Mason is an American attorney, executive, and government official who recently retired from the Department of Veterans Affairs. From November 2017 until August 2022, she served as the fourth Senate-confirmed first woman and military spouse Chairman of the Board of Veterans' Appeals. In 2020, she was named a PREVENTS Task Force Ambassador, along with Lead Ambassador Second Lady Karen Pence. PREVENTS was the first national public health campaign to address suicide prevention. Previously Mason served as Deputy Vice Chairman, Chief Veterans Law Judge, and Veterans Law Judge at the Board. Starting in early 2021, Chairman Mason has worked closely with First Lady Dr. Jill Biden’s Joining Forces initiative to address the challenges and issues of military and veterans families to include military spouse employment and veterans transition.  Chairman Mason also serves as a VA champion and advocate for suicide prevention.

A graduate of Ohio Northern University and Creighton University School of Law, Mason served as an intern for U.S. Representative Bob McEwen. After law school, she worked in private practice in Omaha, Nebraska. Mason became a paralegal coordinator for Central Texas College and an instructor at Central Texas College's branch at Kaiserslautern Military Community in Germany. She was an attorney with the Federal Labor Relations Authority and was a Department of the Air Force (DAF) Civilian with the United States Air Forces in Europe at Ramstein Air Base in Germany. Mason also served as a contract attorney investigator for the United States Department of Justice Civil Rights Division specializing in the Americans with Disabilities Act.

Awards and honors

 Hiring Our Heroes Bonnie Amos Lifetime Achievement Impact Award 2022.
 Disabled American Veterans' Outstanding Federal Executive 2021.
 Department of Veterans Affairs Exceptional Service Award 2020 
 FedHealthIT 2020 Leading for Impact: Women in Leadership Award.
 Hiring our Heroes Military Spouse Employment and Mentoring Award 2019
 Ohio Northern University Distinguished Alumni Award 2009.

References

External links

Living people
Ohio Northern University alumni
Creighton University School of Law alumni
People from Portsmouth, Ohio
21st-century American lawyers
Trump administration personnel
Biden administration personnel
United States Department of Veterans Affairs officials
Year of birth missing (living people)